Senthoora Poove is a 1988 Indian Tamil-language film, directed by P. R. Devaraj, starring Vijayakanth, Ramki, and Nirosha, while Chandrasekhar, Sripriya, C. L. Anandan, Vijaya Lalitha, Anandaraj, Senthil, and Charle play supporting roles. Vijayakanth won his first Tamil Nadu State Film Award for Best Actor.

The story is about how a young girl is ill-treated by her stepmother and how her brother's friend saves her and her husband. The movie enjoyed a run of over 200 days at the box office. It was released on 23 September 1988. The film was remade in Kannada in 1992 as Mallige Hoove.

Plot 
Captain Soundarapandian, a terminally ill convict, hospitalised and nearing death, evades police security and escapes from the hospital. He arrives in Nilambur and confronts a couple, Ashok  and Ponni, who are running away from someone. As they board a train, Soundarapandian gets a massive headache and faints. Seeing a train speeding towards him, Ashok dismounts the train to rescue him. While taking him away from the track, Ponni is abducted by some goons pursuing them. The rest of the goons engage in a fight with Ashok, who is almost defeated when Soundarapandian regains consciousness and subdues them. Ashok and his confidante Gopal take Soundarapandian to the former's shelter, where Gopal hints to have seen Soundarapandian somewhere but does not reveal much due to Soundarapandian's gestures. Meanwhile, Dr. Sundaramurthy, who treats Soundarapandian, decides to find his patient on his own due to the police forces' inefficiency.

Ashok reveals the reason why the goons were following them. Ashok arrived in Nilambur as a field officer. He fell in love with Ponni after hearing her sing a song. Ponni is the daughter of a henpecked landlord Rajavelu. Rajavelu, after his wife's death, married an ambitious woman, Ponnamma, who tortures Ponni for her wealth. As a child, Ponni's marriage was conducted by the evil Ponnamma. After her husband's death, she is forced to live the life of a widow. Ponnamma did this all for amassing Ponni's wealth. The only person who used to be kind to her was Oomaiyan, Ponnamma's son. However, after picking a fight owing to an unfortunate incident with his mother, he left the village, promising to return soon. As soon as Ponni begins to have feelings for Ashok, Ponnamma discovers the truth and swears to separate them.

Soundarapandian's tale is also revealed in a nonlinear way (as his memories). Soundarapandian was a soldier, who, along with a young teacher Radha, jailed a local thug Udayappan. Soundarapandian later married Radha. Gopal was from Soundarapandian's village. Years later, a young man joins their family as a servant. Udayappan, upon escaping from prison, murders Soundarapandian's wife, son, and the servant. Soundarapandian manages to kill Udayappan but not before the latter severely beats him. The servant was Ponni's stepbrother, who, before his death, had requested Soundarapandian to save Ponni from his evil mother, Ponnamma. This was the reason behind his arrival. After failing to negotiate with Ponnamma, Soundarapandian plots to secretly take Ponni away from her house. However, the plan fails, and a nearly killed Soundarapandian is saved by Sundaramurthy.

After learning about Soundarapandian's condition, Ashok decides to leave his love and the village to make Soundarapandian continue his treatment. He later drops the plan after thinking more about it. Soundarapandian, Ashok, and Sundaramurthy make one last attempt to save Ponni. Having enough of his wife, Ponni's father helps her escape and later asks his wife to consume poison before he commits suicide. Ponnamma and her husband both die. Although Ponnamma's goons follow them, Ashok, Ponni, Sundaramurthy, and Soundarapandian manage to escape in a train with Soundarapandian almost dead.

Cast 

Vijayakanth as Captain Soundarapandian
Ramki as Ashok
Nirosha as Ponni
Chandrasekhar as Dr. Sundaramurthy
Sripriya as Radha
C. L. Anandan as  Rajavelu, Ponni's father
Vijaya Lalitha as Ponnamma
Anandaraj as Udayappan
Senthil as Gopal
Charle as Pacchi
Muralidharan as Oomaiyan
 Azhagu as Parameshwaran
Pasi Narayanan as Annakaavadi
Kullamani
Karuppu Subbiah
Vellai Subbaiah
Pakoda Kadhar
Sivaraman

Soundtrack 
The soundtrack was composed by Manoj–Gyan, with lyrics written by Aabavanan, Vairamuthu and Muthulingam. For the dubbed Telugu version Sindhura Puvvu, all lyrics were written by Rajasri.

Reception 
The Indian Express wrote "[..] the knot on which Senthoora Poove bases [..] cooks up another cinematic stew and serves it in style". Vijaykanth won the Cinema Express Award for Best Character Actor. Jayamanmadhan of Kalki criticised the story.

Legacy 
Senthoora Poove is one of only two films directed by P. R. Devaraj, the other being Ilaya Raagam (1995) before his death in May 2016.

References

External links 
 

1980s romantic action films
1980s Tamil-language films
1988 films
Films scored by Manoj–Gyan
Indian romantic action films